Richard James McKay (born March 16, 1959) is an American football executive who is the president and CEO of the Atlanta Falcons of the National Football League (NFL). Prior to joining the Falcons, he was the general manager of the Tampa Bay Buccaneers from 1994 to 2003 and was a part of their Super Bowl XXXVII-winning season.

Early years
McKay is the youngest son of the late John McKay, who was the Buccaneers' first head coach. McKay was a ball boy for the Buccaneers when his father was the head coach.  While his father was head coach at USC in Los Angeles, McKay played quarterback at Bishop Amat High School in La Puente, California. When John McKay took the Tampa Bay job he moved his family, including son Rich, to Florida where McKay played quarterback his senior year at Jesuit High School of Tampa the 1976–1977 season. He earned his bachelor's degree from Princeton University in 1981 and graduated from Stetson University College of Law in 1984. Prior to entering the NFL, McKay was an attorney with the Tampa law firm of Hill, Ward, and Henderson. He and his wife, Terrin, have two sons, Hunter and John.

Professional career

Tampa Bay Buccaneers
As the general manager for the Buccaneers from 1994 to 2003, McKay directed six teams that reached the NFC playoffs and one team that won a Super Bowl title. In 1996, McKay hired Tony Dungy as head coach, and in 1999 the Bucs played in the NFC Championship game.

During his tenure as general manager, McKay drafted players such as Warren Sapp, Mike Alstott, Ronde Barber, Derrick Brooks, and Warrick Dunn. McKay constructed the 2002 Buccaneers' Super Bowl-winning roster that featured seven Pro Bowl players. The Buccaneers' 41 Pro Bowl selections between 1997 through 2002 were the most in the NFL.

Sapp and Brooks – both selected by McKay in the first round of the 1995 NFL Draft – are now both members of the Pro Football Hall of Fame.  Sapp was enshrined in 2013; Brooks in 2014.  According to the Pro Football Hall of Fame, McKay is the only general manager in NFL history to have his first two draft picks as a GM be inducted into the Hall of Fame.

In 1998, McKay, then President and General Manager of the Tampa Bay Buccaneers, worked closely with the Glazer Family, the city of Tampa, former Tampa Mayor Dick Greco, and Tampa Stadium Authority on the successful construction and opening of Raymond James Stadium.

Atlanta Falcons
In December 2003, McKay left the Tampa Bay Buccaneers to become president and general manager of the Atlanta Falcons. In his first season of directing operations, the Falcons went to the NFC Championship game against the Philadelphia Eagles. In January 2008, the Falcons hired Thomas Dimitroff as general manager, relegating McKay to the position of team president, although McKay negotiated Matt Ryan's contract. McKay's Falcons in 2010–11 had 9 Pro Bowlers.

Sixteen years after building Raymond James Stadium in Tampa, McKay, as President and CEO of the Atlanta Falcons, worked closely with Falcons Chairman and owner Arthur Blank, the city of Atlanta, and the Georgia World Congress Center stadium authority to secure approval and financing for the Falcons to build a new $1.2 billion stadium in downtown Atlanta. The Falcons broke ground on the new building on May 19, 2014, and the stadium, known as Mercedes Benz Stadium, opened on August 26, 2017.

McKay is believed to be the only current NFL executive who has been the point person for the negotiations and construction of two NFL stadiums.

On January 9th, 2023 McKay's position with the Atlanta Falcons was changed as just the CEO. Greg Beadles was selected to take over as president. McKay remains in charge of football operations while Beadles operates the business side.

NFL committees
McKay is the longest standing member in the history of the NFL Competition Committee (26 consecutive years, 22 of which he has served in the chairmanship role), making him one of the more influential executives in the league.

McKay has served on the NFL Management Council Working Group of League executives that helps advise on collective bargaining issues. During the 2011 NFL lockout, McKay helped in negotiating a new collective bargaining agreement with the NFLPA. McKay is also a member of the NFL's Health & Safety Committee.

References

1959 births
Living people
Atlanta Falcons executives
Tampa Bay Buccaneers executives
National Football League general managers
National Football League team presidents
Princeton University alumni
Stetson University College of Law alumni
Sportspeople from Eugene, Oregon
Jesuit High School (Tampa) alumni